Roger Hicks (1950–2019) was a British author of more than 30 photography books, plus a biography of 14th Dalai Lama written with Ngakpa Chogyam, a teacher of Buddhism in UK, travel books, cook-books and others. Many were written with his wife Frances Schultz (deceased 25th December, 2020). 

A regular contributor to Amateur Photographer Magazine, he frequently wrote for Shutterbug magazine in the United States.

Publications 
 Roger Hicks and Ngakpa Chogyam, Great Ocean, HarperCollins, 1984,

References

External links
rogerandfrances.com
semiadventuroustraveler.com

British food writers
2019 deaths
1950 births